Simpson Thacher & Bartlett LLP is a white-shoe law firm headquartered in New York City. The firm specializes in litigation and corporate practices, particularly mergers and acquisitions and private equity, with over 1,000 attorneys in 11 offices worldwide.

History
John W. Simpson, Thomas Thacher and William M. Barnum organized the firm as "Simpson, Thacher & Barnum" on January 1, 1884, with offices at 9 Pine Street. The three were formerly law clerks at the old-line firm Alexander & Green. The first associate salary was ten dollars, and the first retainer fee was fifty dollars. In 1889, the name was changed to "Reed Simpson Thacher & Barnum" when former U.S. House Speaker Thomas Brackett Reed joined the firm. Reed died in 1902, and the name was soon changed to Simpson Thacher Barnum & Bartlett. The final change came in 1904 when it was amended to its current name of Simpson Thacher & Bartlett.

From its original location at 9 Pine Street, the firm has operated at many offices throughout New York City until finally settling at its present location at 425 Lexington Avenue opposite Grand Central Terminal. The firm opened its Los Angeles office in 1996, Palo Alto in 1999 and in Washington, D.C. in 2005. Simpson Thacher began its international expansion in the late 70s, beginning with its London office in 1978. Since then, Simpson Thacher has expanded to Tokyo (1990), Hong Kong (1993), Beijing (2007), São Paulo (2009), and Brussels (2021).

In 1988, Simpson Thacher, led by longtime chairman Richard Beattie, advised KKR's $25.1 billion acquisition of RJR Nabisco. It was, at the time, the largest-ever private-equity purchase in history, the details of which are memorialized in the book "Barbarians at the Gate."

Since opening in 1999, the Palo Alto office has experienced remarkable growth in both size and prominence. The Palo Alto branch is now the firm's second largest office and has come to represent some of Silicon Valley's most distinguished tech titans and private equity firms, playing a hand in a string of record breaking transactions.
 In 2004, Simpson Thacher represented the underwriters in Google's $2.7 billion IPO, the largest technology IPO at the time. More recently, the firm has represented Google in its $1.65 billion acquisition of YouTube.
 In 2008, Simpson Thacher represented JPMorgan Chase in a loan repayment transaction that also unintentionally changed a different $1.5 billion secured loan into an unsecured loan, which caused JPMorgan Chase to suffer up to $1.5 billion of losses when the debtor General Motors declared bankruptcy in 2009. Although Simpson Thacher did not originate the error, it failed to catch the mistake — with one firm attorney praising debtor counsel Mayer Brown for a "nice job on the documents," according to an opinion by the Second Circuit Court of Appeals.
 In 2010, the firm represented Tesla Motors in its IPO, the first IPO of a new U.S. car company since Ford Motor Co. in 1956.
 In 2012, Simpson Thacher "helped launch Facebook, Inc." in assisting the underwriters in Facebook's $16 billion IPO, at the time the largest technology offering ever and their third-largest IPO in U.S. history.
 In 2014, the firm set a new record in its representation of Alibaba Group Holding Limited in its initial public offering, the largest IPO ever to be conducted. The record-breaking IPO raised $25 billion, ending its first day of trading with a market capitalization of $231 billion. For this work, the firm was awarded "Global Final Deals of the Year" Award, and Corporate Partners Leiming Chen (Hong Kong) and Bill Hinman (Palo Alto) were each recognized as "Deal Makers of the Year" by the American Lawyer.
 In 2016, the firm represented Microsoft in its $26.2 billion acquisition of LinkedIn.
 In 2018, the firm represented Microsoft in its $7.5 billion acquisition of GitHub.

Notable alumni
Simpson Thacher lawyers have included U.S. Senators, Solicitors General, a Speaker of the House of Representatives, a Secretary of State, a Secretary of the Army, Ambassadors, Judges on U.S. Circuit and District Courts and the New York State Court of Appeals, presidents of the American Bar Association, and presidents of the Association of the Bar of the City of New York.

Judiciary
 Guido Calabresi (Summer Associate) - Senior Circuit Court Judge, Court of Appeals for the Second Circuit.
 Thomas D. Thacher - Former District Court Judge, Southern District of New York.
 Dennis G. Jacobs - Circuit Court Judge and Former Chief Judge, Court of Appeals for the Second Circuit.
 Eric Vitaliano - District Court Judge, Eastern District of New York.
 Mary Kay Vyskocil, District Court Judge, Southern District of New York.
Government
 Cyrus Vance - Former United States Secretary of State, Secretary of the Army and the Deputy Secretary of Defense.
 Thomas D. Thacher - Former Solicitor General of the United States. 
 Dwight Morrow - Former United States Senator, New Jersey.
 Thomas Brackett Reed - Former Speaker of the House, United States House of Representatives.
 Anne-Marie Slaughter - Former Director of Policy Planning, United States State Department.
 Keith Noreika - Acting U.S. Comptroller of the Currency
 Bim Afolami -  MP for Hitchin and Harpenden
Business
 Suzanne Nora Johnson - Former Vice Chairmen, Goldman Sachs.
 Anne-Marie Slaughter - President and CEO, New America Foundation.
 Lynn Forester de Rothschild - CEO of E.L. Rothschild.
 Alan D. Schnitzer - chairman and CEO, The Travelers Companies, Inc.
 Euwyn Poon - President and Founder, Spin

Academia
 Guido Calabresi (Summer Associate) - Former Dean, Yale Law School
 Karenna Gore Schiff - Author, journalist and Director of the Union Theological Seminary.
 Eleanor M. Fox - Walter J. Derenberg Professor of Trade Regulation in the New York University School of Law
 Deborah N. Archer, Esq. President of the American Civil Liberties Union
Others
 Charlie Reiter (born 1988), soccer player
 Whitney North Seymour - Former President, American Bar Association, Legal Aid Society, and New York City Bar Association.

Associate compensation
In 2007, Simpson Thacher led the market by raising the base salary for first-year associates to $160,000 per year. In the process, it established the market salary for all of its peer firms in New York City. Simpson Thacher again led the market in 2014 when it raised associate bonuses by as much as $40,000, matched within hours by other New York elite firms Paul, Weiss, Rifkind, Wharton & Garrison and Cleary Gottlieb Steen & Hamilton.

In 2016, law firm Cravath, Swaine and Moore LLP beat the "Simpson salary scale" for the first time in nearly a decade with a 12.5% increase in associate base salary, a move that was promptly matched by Simpson Thacher and other large law firms. As of March 2, 2022, the base salary for first-year Simpson Thacher associates begins at $215,000.

Rankings and awards
Simpson Thacher & Bartlett is consistently among the most profitable large law firms in the world on a per-partner basis according to The American Lawyer'''s annual AmLaw 100 Survey. The firm is also recognized in various other surveys, including Vault.com's 2010 review of the 20 Best Law Firms to Work For.
 Ranked among the most prestigious law firms to work for in the United States by Vault Law 100, placing 8th in 2022.
 Named "Finance Litigation Department of the Year" in 2022 by The New York Law Journal. 
 Ranked among the Top 10 Law Firms in the 2016 Vault Rankings in 11 categories, including Securities, Banking and Financial Services, M&A, Private Equity, General Corporate Practice, Real Estate, and Tax.
 2016 U.S. News "Law Firm of the Year" Award for Mergers and Acquisitions.
 Recognized in 33 categories, including 18 in the National Tier 1 category, in U.S. News 2016 Law Firm Rankings.
 Simpson Thacher was honored with an Above and Beyond Award by the Department of Defense in recognition of extraordinary support for its employees serving in the Guard and Reserve.

It is among the most profitable large law firms in the world on a per-partner basis according to the American Lawyer’s'' annual AmLaw 100 Survey. Simpson Thacher had a gross revenue of approximately $1.4 billion in 2017 with an estimated profits per partner of $3,485,000.

The firm has represented the buyer in the five largest completed buyouts in history.

The firm is also consistently deemed by a number of rankings and surveys as one of the most prestigious law firms in the nation, including AboveTheLaw, Vault 100, and Forbes.

See also
 List of largest law firms by profits per partner

References

External links
 

 
Law firms based in New York City
Law firms established in 1884
Foreign law firms with offices in Hong Kong
Foreign law firms with offices in Japan